Zakharovka is a rural locality (a selo) in Solodchinskoye Rural Settlement, Olkhovsky District, Volgograd Oblast, Russia. The population was 258 as of 2010. There are 5 streets.

Geography 
Zakharovka is located in steppe, on the right bank of the Ilovlya River, 25 km southwest of Olkhovka (the district's administrative centre) by road. Dmitriyevka is the nearest rural locality.

References 

Rural localities in Olkhovsky District
Tsaritsynsky Uyezd